Urmar Tanda is a town and municipal council in Hoshiarpur district, Punjab, India.

Demographics
In the 2001 Indian census, Urmar Tanda's population contained 22,115 people, of whom 52% of them were male and 48% were female. Urmar Tanda has an average literacy rate of 74%, higher than the 59.5% national average. The literacy rate suggests there are gender differences in education with male literacy at 77% but female literacy at 71%. 11% of the population are under 6 years of age.

Tourism
Urmar Tanda has a variety of tourist attractions such as Shimla Pahari Park; Shri Mahadev  Mandir; Ram Mandir Ahiyapur; Jahara Peer; Gurudwara Pull Pukhta Sahib; Gurudwara Tahli Sahib;Bheem Mandir; Baba 'Jathere baba kamuana ji...saini(gehlan), every year they organise a akhand paath in June, thousands of peoples around the world gather to pray to sri guru granth sahib ji

Transport
Urmar Tanda is situated on NH-1A highway. The city has various railway and road links. State highways connect it to nearby cities such as Jalandhar, Hoshiarpur, Shri Hargobindpur and Dasuya. Urmar Tanda also has roads linking to Amritsar, Pathankot and Hajipur. It is on the junction of Chandigarh to Gurdaspur, Pathankot road and Pathankot to Jalandhar Road.

History

This city has been linked with Sikh Guru Har Gobind sahib Ji, the sixth guru in the history of the Sikhs, who visited various places such as village Pull Pukhta, and village Munak Kallan where he is said to have tied his horse and stayed for several days.

Religious Sites
Religious places to be visited in Urmar Tanda include: Gurudwara, Pull Pukhta Sahib, Gurudwara Tahli Sahib, Bheem Mandir (Bhimashankar Temple), Jahar Peer, Bhotu Mandir (Shiva), Baba Bhutta Bhagat Mandir, and Baba Bhai Chaiya Mandir.Gurudwara Baba  Kamuaana (SALA PUR )

References

Cities and towns in Hoshiarpur district